John Pierce (born in Montana) is an American country music singer-songwriter. His debut single, "I'd Still Have You," peaked at No. 59 on the Billboard Hot Country Songs chart in February 2006. Pierce recorded an album for RCA Nashville with producer Byron Gallimore that was originally scheduled to be released in 2006.

Pierce wrote Zac Brown Band's number one single "Sweet Annie".

Songs written:

Zac Brown "Sweet Annie"
Jon Pardi "Your Heart Or Mine"
Jon Pardi "Buy That Man A Beer"
Morgan Wallen "F150-50"
Dalton Dover "Giving Up On That"

Chris Young  "Leave You Wanting More"
Kameron Marlowe "Ain't Enough Whiskey"
Trey Lewis "Single Again"

Reba McEntire "Freedom"

Aaron Pritchet "Out Of The Blue"

Brett Kissel "Drink,Cuss,Fish"

Lainey Wilson "Pipe"

Randall King' "Record High"

Granger Smith "Heroes"
Joe Nichols "Dance With The Girl"

Drake Milligan "Don't Look Down"

Drake Milligan "She"

Trace Adkins "Big"

Trace Adkins "Cowboy Up"

Kat and Alex "Most Nights"
Dalton Dover "You've Got A Small Town"
Ray Fulcher "John Wayne"

Drew Baldridge "Middle Of Nowhere Kids"

Discography

Singles

References

Living people
Country musicians from Montana
American country singer-songwriters
American male singer-songwriters
RCA Records Nashville artists
Songwriters from Montana
Year of birth missing (living people)